The 2009 Irish local elections were held in all the counties, cities and towns of the Republic of Ireland on Friday, 5 June 2009, on the same day as the European Parliament election and two by-elections (Dublin South and Dublin Central).

Overview
The election results were significant for a number of reasons:
Fine Gael gained 88 seats and became the largest party at local level for the first time ever.
Fianna Fáil lost 135 seats and became the second-largest party nationally, and the third-largest in Dublin.
The Labour Party increased its seat total by 43 seats, and became the largest party on Dublin City Council. It also held the most seats on the four Dublin local authorities.
Sinn Féin support remained at almost the same level, gaining 2 seats.
The Green Party lost 14 seats and had 3 county councillors.
The People Before Profit Alliance won 5 seats in its first local elections.
The Socialist Party won 6 seats, a gain of 2 seats.

Results
The total number of the Irish electorate eligible to vote in the election was 3,259,253. A total of 1,880,589 first preference votes were cast, representing a turnout of 57.7%.

The Progressive Democrats and Independent Fianna Fáil did not compete in the elections. As they competed in the previous elections, totals for vote and seat changes may not total zero. People Before Profit Alliance figures are compared to Socialist Workers Party figures from the previous local elections.

All councils

County and city councils

Detailed results by council

Following the June 2009 local elections Fine Gael were the largest political party on 24 councils, the Labour Party on 4 councils, Fianna Fáil on 3 councils, Independents on 2 councils and Sinn Féin on 1 council.

Borough and town councils

Borough councils

Town councils

See also
Local government in the Republic of Ireland
:Category:Irish local government councils

Footnotes

References

 Volume 1: City and County Councils
 Volume 2: Borough and Town Councils

External links
2009 Local elections result – ElectionsIreland.org

 
Local
Local
2009
June 2009 events in Europe